Genjer-Genjer is an Osing language folk song from East Java, Indonesia, written and composed by musician Muhammad Arief. The song was written as a description of the condition of the people of Banyuwangi during the Japanese occupation period. The song focuses on the struggle of the peasants, who were forced to eat the genjer plant (Limnocharis flava) – a plant initially considered a pest – to survive.

The song was first recorded during the Japanese occupation of the Dutch East Indies in 1942 by Muhammad Arief, arranged for angklung; the Japanese military occupation government used the song as propaganda to encourage Indonesians to live austerely during wartime as crops were diverted to feed soldiers on the frontlines, leading to widespread famine and starvation. The propaganda campaign introduced Indonesians throughout Java to the song.

In the late 1950s and early 60s, Genjer-genjer gained popularity throughout Indonesia, and the country's political left began to take interest in the song. The song's themes of peasant hardship and perseverance resonated with the Communist Party of Indonesia (PKI) in particular. In the 60s, the song gained more familiarity and popularity with Indonesians as it had air time on television through TVRI and radio through RRI. Well-known musicians also came to record Genjer-Genjer, most notably Bing Slamet and Lilis Suryani.

In 1965, Genjer-Genjer became entangled in the New Order’s mythology of the September 30th Movement, an abortive supposed left-wing coup (that was instead organized by the CIA and Suharto himself) that took place on October 1, 1965, that Suharto used as a pretext to launch a counter-coup and bring his own authoritarian government to power. During the coup, seven generals were abducted by the September 30th movement and then killed at a site called Lubang Buaya. In order to bolster its own legitimacy and further discredit the Indonesian Left, the New Order fabricated a story about how during the killings members of the PKI youth  (People's Youth( and women (Gerwani) organizations danced and took part in orgies as they mutilated the generals while singing songs, including Genjer-Genjer. The only evidence that the New Order presented for the song's use during the killings is unreliable and fabricated, however, stemming from confessions extracted through torture and a book of Indonesian folk songs that included lyrics for Genjer-Genjer found left behind at Halim Airforce Base (the coup headquarters).

Given Genjer-Genjer’s connection to the politics and culture of the left and its alleged connection to the September 30th Movement, the New Order quickly banned the song. The ban on the song ended in 1998 with Suharto's resignation and the end of the New Order. Since 1998, more and more Indonesian musicians have begun to perform the song, though the stigma that became attached to it during the days of the New Order has not yet dissipated fully from Indonesian society. The American rock band Dengue Fever also recorded a version of Genjer-genjer in 2016, though with lyrics in Khmer.

Lyrics

Genjer-genjer (Osing Language)

Genjer-genjer nong kedokan pating keleler
Genjer-genjer nong kedokan pating keleler
Emake thulik teka-teka mbubuti genjer
Emake thulik teka-teka mbubuti genjer
Ulih sak tenong mungkur sedhot sing tulih-tulih
Genjer-genjer saiki wis digawa mulih 

Genjer-genjer isuk-isuk didol ning pasar
Genjer-genjer isuk-isuk didol ning pasar
Dijejer-jejer diuntingi padha didhasar
Dijejer-jejer diuntingi padha didhasar
Emake jebeng padha tuku nggawa welasah
Genjer-genjer saiki wis arep diolah 

Genjer-genjer mlebu kendhil wedang gemulak
Genjer-genjer mlebu kendhil wedang gemulak
Setengah mateng dientas ya dienggo iwak
Setengah mateng dientas ya dienggo iwak
Sego sak piring sambel jeruk ring pelanca
Genjer-genjer dipangan musuhe sega 

Genjer-genjer (Rough English translation)

Genjer laying all through the rice fields
Genjer laying all through the rice fields
The mother of the boy comes to pick genjer
The mother of the boy comes to pick genjer
Taking a bunch she turns away without looking
Now genjer has been brought back home 

Every morning genjer is sold at the market
Every morning genjer is sold at the market
Laid out in rows tied up to be sold
Laid out in rows tied up to be sold
The mother of the girl buys genjer while carrying a woven bamboo basket
Genjer now can be cooked 

Genjer enters a pot of boiling water
Genjer enters a pot of boiling water
Half-cooked it is drained as a side dish
Half-cooked it is drained as a side dish
A plate of rice and orange sambal in front
Genjer is eaten with rice

References

Genjer-genjer 

Indonesian songs
Political songs